Coby Joseph Dietrick (born July 23, 1948) is an American former professional basketball player.

A 6'10" forward/center from San José State University, Dietrick played thirteen seasons (1970–1983) of professional basketball in both the American Basketball Association and the National Basketball Association. He spent the majority of his career with the San Antonio Spurs, a team that began in the ABA but joined the NBA after the ABA–NBA merger in 1976. He also played with the NBA's Chicago Bulls. In 1983 he retired with ABA/NBA career averages of 6.1 points per game and 4.5 rebounds per game.

He later worked as a color commentator for the Spurs.  He also opened the first Relax The Back franchise store, in San Antonio in 1989.

References

External links

Coby Dietrick at MySA.com

1948 births
Living people
American men's basketball players
Basketball players from Riverside, California
Centers (basketball)
Chicago Bulls players
Dallas Chaparrals players
Memphis Pros players
Power forwards (basketball)
San Antonio Spurs players
Tampa Bay Thrillers players
San Francisco Warriors draft picks
San Jose State Spartans men's basketball players